The 1992–93 season was the 45th season in Vardar’s history and their first in the Macedonian First League.

In that season Vardar was won the championship for the first time without a loss and a first Macedonian Cup.

Competitions

Overall

First League

Classification

Results by round

Matches

1 Match abandoned before the kick-off due to the crowd trouble when Čkembari burned seats, collapsed the protective fence and clashed with the police. Vardar were awarded a 0–3 win.
Source: Google Groups

Macedonian Football Cup

Source: Google Groups

See also
List of unbeaten football club seasons

References

FK Vardar seasons
Vardar